Spear & Jackson are a gardening and hand tool supplier headquartered in Sheffield, South Yorkshire, England.

History

Formation
In 1760, Alexander Spear and John Love formed a company in Sheffield called Spear & Love. In 1814, John Spear, the nephew of Alexander, took on an apprentice called Sam Jackson. In 1830, the partnership Spear & Jackson was formed.

Eclipse
In 1889, James Neill patented composite steel - steel-backed iron. He registered his composite steel products under the Eclipse trademark in 1909. The name was taken from the famous racehorse Eclipse, who even though he had died over a hundred years earlier was still famous for his dominating success. The phrase "Eclipse first and the rest nowhere" was still in such common use that Neill adopted it as a marketing slogan for his products. Eclipse no longer manufacture any tools in Britain.

Eclipse made the world's first composite steel hacksaw blade in 1911. The company began manufacturing hacksaws in 1924. All hacksaws are now built according to their design.

Ownership
The Spear & Jackson brand is owned by SNH Global, purchased from Hong Kong-based United Pacific Industries Limited in 2014. Initially bought by Neill Tools in 1985, when known as Spear & Jackson International plc. James Neill Tools, previously a family-owned business, initially made a public issue of shares in 1970.  In 1989, the business' centenary year, Neill Tools was acquired by the MMG Patricof Group, which said it wanted to expand the business and refloat in c.5 years.  In 1995, Neill Tools renamed itself Spear & Jackson plc. Its headquarters have always been in Sheffield. Previous Chairmen of the business, when still family-owned, were Sir Frederick Neill and Sir Hugh Neill.

Tools
The company made handsaws from the beginning (1760); in 1833 Henry Disston, a toolmaker, emigrated to the United States and in 1840 started manufacturing saws. The Disston "skew-back" saw was introduced in 1874 and Spear and Jackson also introduced a skew-back design in the late 19th century, with one example being their 1887 Jubilee Saw.

Structure
The company is the trading name of Neill Tools Ltd, and is owned by SNH Global.

Market
It has activities in 115 countries.

References

External links
 History of Spear & Jackson

Garden tool manufacturers
Tool manufacturing companies of the United Kingdom
Horticultural companies of the United Kingdom
Manufacturing companies based in Sheffield
Manufacturing companies established in 1830
1830 establishments in England
British brands